Serengeti Shall Not Die (also known as Serengeti ) is a 1959 German documentary film written and directed by Bernhard Grzimek.

His son, cinematographer Michael Grzimek, died on-location during the filming of the documentary when a plane he piloted collided with a vulture.

It won the Academy Award for Best Documentary Feature in 1960.

References

External links
 

West German films
1950s German-language films
German documentary films
Best Documentary Feature Academy Award winners
Documentary films about animals
Documentary films about nature
Films set in Tanzania
1959 films
1959 documentary films
1950s German films